The 1942 Philadelphia Athletics season involved the A's finishing eighth in the American League with a record of 55 wins and 99 losses.

Offseason 
 November 26, 1941: Fred Chapman was traded by the Athletics to the Toronto Maple Leafs for Walter Klimczak (minors).
 December 9, 1941: Wally Moses was traded by the Athletics to the Chicago White Sox for Mike Kreevich and Jack Hallett.

Regular season

Season standings

Record vs. opponents

Notable transactions 
 June 1, 1942: Frankie Hayes was traded by the Athletics to the St. Louis Browns for Bob Harris and Bob Swift.

Roster

Player stats

Batting

Starters by position 
Note: Pos = Position; G = Games played; AB = At bats; H = Hits; Avg. = Batting average; HR = Home runs; RBI = Runs batted in

Other batters 
Note: G = Games played; AB = At bats; H = Hits; Avg. = Batting average; HR = Home runs; RBI = Runs batted in

Pitching

Starting pitchers 
Note: G = Games pitched; IP = Innings pitched; W = Wins; L = Losses; ERA = Earned run average; SO = Strikeouts

Other pitchers 
Note: G = Games pitched; IP = Innings pitched; W = Wins; L = Losses; ERA = Earned run average; SO = Strikeouts

Relief pitchers 
Note: G = Games pitched; W = Wins; L = Losses; SV = Saves; ERA = Earned run average; SO = Strikeouts

Farm system 

LEAGUE CHAMPIONS: WilmingtonToronto affiliation shared with Pittsburgh Pirates

References

External links
1942 Philadelphia Athletics team page at Baseball Reference
1942 Philadelphia Athletics team page at www.baseball-almanac.com

Oakland Athletics seasons
Philadelphia Athletics season
Oakland